This is a list of gliders/sailplanes of the world, (this reference lists all gliders with references, where available) 
Note: Any aircraft can glide for a short time, but gliders are designed to glide for longer.

Turkish miscellaneous constructors 

 Galatasaray Kleopatra – Galatasaray High School
 Yildiz 1928 glider – Ali Yildiz
 MKEK 6

Notes

Further reading

External links

Lists of glider aircraft